The Balgalal Creek, a mostlyperennial river that is part of the Lachlan sub-catchment of the Murrumbidgee catchment within the Murray–Darling basin, is located in the South West Slopes region of New South Wales, Australia.

Course and features 
The Balgalal Creek (technically a river) rises south southeast of Eubindal, on the south western slopes of the Great Dividing Range, and flows generally southwest before reaching its confluence with the Jugiong Creek.

See also 

 List of rivers of New South Wales (A-K)
 Rivers of New South Wales
 Janet Dawson

References

External links
 

Tributaries of the Lachlan River
Rivers of New South Wales